Arisa (born 1982) is an Italian singer.

Arisa may also refer to:

Arisa (given name), a feminine given name
Arisa (manga), a Japanese manga series
Arisa (album), a 1991 album by Arisa Mizuki
Arisa Station, a railway station in Yatsushiro, Kumamoto, Japan
Arisa River, a river of Venezuela
ARISA, a molecular biology technique

See also
Alisa (disambiguation)